The 2003 American Le Mans Series season was the fifth season for the IMSA American Le Mans Series, and the 33rd overall season of the IMSA GT Championship.  It was a series for Le Mans Prototypes (LMP) and Grand Touring (GT) race cars divided into 4 classes: LMP900, LMP675, GTS, and GT.  It began March 15, 2003 and ended October 18, 2003 after 9 races.

Dyson Racing's overall win at Sonoma Raceway was the first time in ALMS history that the overall win was captured by a vehicle not from the LMP900 class.

Schedule
Little was changed between the 2002 and 2003 schedules; the Grand Prix of Washington, D. C. and Mid-Ohio Sports Car Course did not return, but both were instead replaced by the return of the Grand Prix of Atlanta at Road Atlanta. The Grand Prix of Mexico was originally scheduled for April 6 at the Autodromo Hermanos Rodriguez but was canceled due to financial issues.

Season results
Overall winner in bold.

Teams Championship
Points are awarded to the top 10 finishers in the following order:
 20-16-13-10-8-6-4-3-2-1
Exceptions being for the 12 Hours of Sebring and Petit Le Mans which award the top 10 finishers in the following order:
 26-22-19-16-14-12-10-9-8-7

Cars failing to complete 70% of the winner's distance are not awarded points.  Teams only score the points of their highest finishing entry in each race.

LMP900 Standings

LMP675 Standings

GTS Standings

GT Standings

External links
American Le Mans Series homepage
 IMSA Archived ALMS Results and Points

American Le Mans
American Le Mans
American Le Mans Series seasons